
Gmina Nowa Brzeźnica is a rural gmina (administrative district) in Pajęczno County, Łódź Voivodeship, in central Poland.

Villages
Gmina Nowa Brzeźnica contains the villages and settlements of Dubidze, Dubidze-Kolonia, Dworszowice Kościelne, Dworszowice Kościelne-Kolonia, Gojsc, Janów, Jedle, Kaflarnia, Kolonia Gidelska, Konstantynów, Kruplin Radomszczański, Kruplin Średni, Kruplin-Barbarówka, Kruplin-Parcela, Kruplin-Piaski, Kuźnica, Łążek, Madera, Miroszowy, Moczydła, Nowa Brzeźnica, Orczuchy, Pieńki Dubidzkie, Pieńki Dworszowskie, Płaczki, Płaszczyzna, Prusicko, Rybaki, Rzędowie, Stara Brzeźnica, Stoczki, Trzebca, Wierzba, Wólka Prusicka, Zapole and Zimna Woda.

Neighbouring gminas
Gmina Nowa Brzeźnica is bordered by the gminas of Kruszyna, Ładzice, Miedźno, Mykanów, Pajęczno, Popów and Strzelce Wielkie.

References
 Polish official population figures 2006

Nowa Brzeznica
Pajęczno County